Cichobórz may refer to the following places in Poland:
Cichobórz, Lower Silesian Voivodeship (south-west Poland)
Cichobórz, Lublin Voivodeship (east Poland)